Rareș Cristian Bălan (born 19 January 2000) is a Romanian professional footballer who plays as a right-back for Liga I side CFR Cluj.

Club career
Bălan made his debut for CFR Cluj on 22 May 2022, in a 3–1 Liga I loss with FCSB.

Career statistics

Club

Honours
CFR Cluj
Liga I: 2021–22
Supercupa României runner-up: 2022

References

External links
 
 

2000 births
Living people
Sportspeople from Bistrița
Romanian footballers
Association football defenders
Liga I players
Liga III players
CFR Cluj players
ACF Gloria Bistrița players
21st-century Romanian people